Liparis antarcticus is a fish from the genus Liparis. It is a marine fish that lives in the demersal zone. Liparis antarcticus can be found in the Southeast Pacific Ocean by Chile, and it is the only known species from its genus to live in the Southern Hemisphere.

References

Liparis (fish)
Taxa named by Frederic Ward Putnam
Fish described in 1874
Endemic fauna of Chile